The Worlds of H. Beam Piper is a collection of short stories written by H. Beam Piper, and edited by John F. Carr. The book was published in 1983 by Ace Books.  None of these stories take place in either Piper’s Terro-Human Future History series nor in his Paratime series, except for "Genesis" which fits in with both series.

Contents
 Introduction by John F. Carr.
 "Time and Again" (text at Project Gutenberg)  First appeared in Astounding Science Fiction, April 1947.
 "The Mercenaries" (text)  First appeared in Astounding Science Fiction, March 1950.
 "Dearest" (text)  First appeared in Weird Tales, March 1951.
 "Hunter Patrol", written with John J. McGuire (text)  First appeared in Amazing Science Fiction, May 1959.
 "Flight From Tomorrow" (text)  First appeared in Future combined with Science Fiction Stories, September/October 1950.
 "Operation R.S.V.P." (text)  First appeared in Amazing Science Fiction, January 1951.
 "Genesis" (text)  First appeared in Future combined with Science Fiction Stories, September 1951.
 "The Answer" (text)  First appeared in Fantastic Universe Science Fiction, December 1959.
 "Crossroads of Destiny" (text)  First appeared in Fantastic Universe Science Fiction, July 1959.
 "Day of the Moron" (text)  First appeared in Astounding Science Fiction, September 1951

References

1983 short story collections
Science fiction short story collections
Ace Books books
Works by H. Beam Piper